Dying to Live: The Journey into a Man's Open Heart is a documentary film by actor and filmmaker Ben Mittleman. The film is based on his experiences through open-heart surgery while caring for his wife and his mother as they struggle with life-threatening illnesses.

Synopsis
Documentary filmmaker Ben Mittleman turns the camera on himself when confronted with the same open-heart surgery that derailed his father's life. A quest for truth, Dying to Live gives public exposure to his own fears about mortality. In the same year Mittleman's wife Valerie and mother Anne each struggle with their own life-threatening illnesses. And, it's these affairs of his heart that contain the soul of Dying to Live. A love letter to Valerie, Dying to Live reveals the raw realities of Mittleman's fight to survive and heal the women who love him. With rare humor and spirit, the tale is told of an ordinary man struggling as he dives deeper into adulthood.

Outreach
The film premiered as a benefit for the Los Angeles Caregivers Resource Center and was also featured at the 2008 American Society on Aging and National Council on Aging Media Festival. Dying to Live was also screened at the Jacksonville Film Festival.

References

External links

Reviews
  The New York Times - Mark Deming
 LA Weekly - Gavin Williamson
 Film Monthly - Jef Burnham
 Backstage - Brooke O'Neill
 Voice of America - Mike O'Sullivan

2008 films
2008 documentary films
Documentary films about health care
Documentary films about death
2000s English-language films